Viroinval is a municipality of Wallonia located in the province of Namur, Belgium. 

On January 1, 2006, Viroinval had a total population of 5,680. The total area is 120.90 km2 which gives a population density of 47 inhabitants per km2.

The municipality consists of the following districts: Dourbes, Mazée, Le Mesnil, Nismes, Oignies-en-Thiérache, Olloy-sur-Viroin, Treignes, Vierves-sur-Viroin.

The name Viroinval, Viroin (River) Valley, was chosen for the municipality that was formed by fusing eight villages, in 1977.<ref
 name="Villages"></ref>

Attractions

From 1995 to 2004, Viroinval was the location of the geographical centre of the European Union, at coordinates  in Oignies-en-Thiérache, and a monument there records that finding. On May 1, 2004, the EU expanded from fifteen states to twenty-five, and the geographical centre of the union moved eastwards to the village of Kleinmaischeid, Rhineland-Palatinate, Germany. On 1 January 2007 it shifted even further south-eastwards.
The tourist steam train line Mariembourg–Treignes has most of its stations in villages of Viroinval: Nismes, Olloy-sur-Viroin, Vierves-sur-Viroin, and Treignes.<ref
 name="SteamTrainLine"></ref> The latter village has a relevant museum.<ref
 name="SteamTrainMuseum"></ref>

References

External links

Official Website of the municipality
The former Centre of the European Union
Awarded "EDEN - European Destinations of Excellence" non traditional tourist destination 2009

Municipalities of Namur (province)